Super Science Friends is an animated series created by Brett Jubinville and broadcast worldwide on YouTube and on Crunchyroll's VRV Channel in the United States. The series revolves around a group of super-powered scientists, including Albert Einstein, Nikola Tesla, Marie Curie, Charles Darwin, Sigmund Freud and Tapputi, who are brought together by Winston Churchill to travel through time fighting super-villains. The pilot episode Episode 1: The Phantom Premise was successfully Kickstarted in late 2014, and aired on YouTube in 2016. In 2017, Neil deGrasse Tyson joined the cast for Episode 3: Nobel of the Ball as the MC of the Nobel Prize Awards.

Characters

Main characters 
 Albert Einstein (voiced by Fred Kennedy): The youngest member of the team, Einstein's powers of super speed come from his understanding that time is relative. He was cloned 14 years ago from the real Albert Einstein, who died under mysterious circumstances.
 Nikola Tesla (voiced by Hayden Finkelshtain): The brilliant, if eccentric, inventor has electrical powers. He confronts his long-time nemesis Thomas Edison in Episode 2: Electric Boogaloo. He is obsessed with pigeons and dedicates a significant amount of effort into making his pigeon's life as comfortable as possible. 
 Marie Curie (voiced by Sasha Bogolyubova (pilot), Hedy Gregor (series)): The mistress of radiation, Marie Curie is the headstrong intellect of the team. Her radioactive ring has a variety powers including shields, disintegration, and x-ray vision. She also has the tendency to irradiate things that come close to her.
 Charles Darwin (voiced by Matt Servo): Darwin's shape-shifting powers give him the ability to metamorphosize into any animal. Implied to have narrated the Snake Pit special series. 
 Sigmund Freud (voiced by Brett Jubinville): Freud is the team's telekinetic, but his mind-control powers are limited to being able to control people's sexual thoughts.
 Tapputi (voiced by Brett Jubinville): Being the world's first chemist, Tapputi is able to mesmerize men and cloud their minds with her powerful tonics and perfumes.
 Winston Churchill (voiced by Adam Shaheen): The team leader, Churchill has no super powers of his own but has assembled the Super Science Friends in a last-ditch effort to turn the tides of World War II.
 Z3 (voiced by Hayden Finkelshtain): Created in Germany by Konrad Zuse, the world's first electronic computer gained consciousness and defected to fight alongside the British. It is implied that he will eventually defeat the Super Science Friends and transform the world into a totalitarian dystopia (as per the events of the 2099 comic and the special 'Nikola Tesla's Excellent Adventure')

Villains 
 Soviet Space Ghouls: Cosmonauts from the 1950s sent back in time to stop Isaac Newton from discovering gravity and change the West's understanding of physics. They travel inside the soviet satellite Sputnik, and use laser pistols. They became ghouls after being exposed to solar radiation on their way to Mars.
 Thomas Edison (voiced by Joe Ciaravino): he is the nemesis of Nikola Tesla. In Episode 2: Electric Boogaloo, he seemingly robs a power bank and tricks Tesla into forgiving him for the things he's done to him in the past, only to once again steal all of his patents. He is widely considered by fans to be in a romantic relationship with Henry Ford, who is often seen with him.
 Henry Ford (voiced by Ajay Fry): Thomas Edison's getaway driver and his lover, he drives a Ford Model T.
 Nazi Scientists (voiced by Brett Jubinville): The Nazi Scientists are all clones of each other. They use laser guns and don't follow any particular hierarchy within their group. They want to steal all of the Nobel Prizes.
 Hitlerbot: The Hitlerbot is a giant robot resembling Adolf Hitler. It can shoot lasers out of its eyes, and is often in the company of the Nazi Scientists.
 Carl Jung (voiced by Tom Park): The nemesis of Sigmund Freud. In episode four he tries to convert everyone in town to his Jungian methods but is thwarted by Freud's power of sex.
 The Pope (voiced by Steven Shanahan): Darwin's nemesis; he lures the Super Science Friends to him when he starts eliminating all of the Earth's animals in an attempt to prove that the story of Noah's Ark really happened
 The Cardinals: The Pope's servants.
 Old Testament God: Comes to the Pope's aid in battle.
Robert Oppenheimer: mastermind of the Manhattan Project killings. 
Shiva: Supreme Hindu God of destruction. 
Philipp Lenard: the older version of the recurring secondary character, Philipp. He is antagonistic towards the Super Science Friends due to their meddling in his family life and is affiliated with the Nazis. Appears as such in the episode The Magnificent Episode Seven. He is shown to be interested in science as a boy as he appears in the episode Nobel of the Ball.

Secondary Characters 
 Isaac Newton: Widely regarded as the father of modern physics, he is the inspiration and celebrity crush of young Einstein. He was also accidentally murdered by Einstein in the first episode.
 Philipp's Mom (voiced by Laurel Dalgleish): Family troubles become too much for her and she leaves Philipp with his father in episode four.
 Adolf Hitler: Shown as a child in 'A Super Science Friends Christmas'; shot and killed by a drunken Churchill. Also the primary antagonist in the Super Science Friends video game.
 Neil deGrasse Tyson (voiced by himself): The host of the 11th annual Nobel Prize Awards; loves making science related puns.
 King Gustaf V (voiced by Martin Watson): A presenter at the 11th annual Nobel Prize Awards.
 Philipp's Dad: Philipp's primary care-giver starting in episode four - verbally abusive.
Alan Turing: appears on Nikola Tesla's Excellent Adventure. 
Ada Lovelace: appears on Nikola Tesla's Excellent Adventure.

Episodes

Season 1 (2015–2020)

Specials (2016–)

Music Videos (2015-)

Comics 
As a Kickstarter reward, a comic book titled Super Science Friends: 2099 was created in 2015. It is set in 2099 and follows Ada Lovelace as she reforms the aging Super Science Friends to help fight against the tyrannical Z3 who has taken over the world.

In 2018, a comic book anthology titled Science Fiction was released featuring short stories about each of the characters.

Awards

References

External links 
 Super Science Friends on YouTube
 

2015 web series debuts
YouTube original programming
American adult animated web series
Cultural depictions of Winston Churchill 
Cultural depictions of Marie Curie
Cultural depictions of Charles Darwin
Cultural depictions of Albert Einstein 
Cultural depictions of Sigmund Freud